Cosmopterix chlorochalca is a moth of the family Cosmopterigidae. It is known from Australia.

References

chlorochalca